Kathak is one of the eight major forms of Indian classical dance. It is the classical dance form from Uttar Pradesh. The origin of Kathak is traditionally attributed to the traveling bards in ancient northern India known as Kathakars or storytellers. The term Kathak is derived from the Vedic Sanskrit word  which means "story", and Kathakar which means "the one who tells a story", or "to do with stories". Wandering Kathakars communicated stories from the great epics and ancient mythology through dance, songs and music. Kathak dancers tell various stories through their hand movements and extensive footwork, their body movements and flexibility but most importantly through their facial expressions. Kathak evolved during the Bhakti movement, particularly by incorporating the childhood and stories of the Hindu god Krishna, as well as independently in the courts of north Indian kingdoms. During the period of Mughal rule, the emperors were patrons of Kathak dance and actively promoted it in their royal courts.  Kathak performances include Urdu Ghazals and commonly used instruments brought during the Mughal period. As a result, it is the only Indian classical dance form to feature Persian elements.

Kathak is found in three distinct forms, called "gharanas", named after the cities where the Kathak dance tradition evolved – Jaipur, Banaras and Lucknow. While the Jaipur gharana focuses more on the foot movements, the Banaras and Lucknow gharanas focus more on facial expressions and graceful hand movements. Stylistically, the Kathak dance form emphasizes rhythmic foot movements, adorned with small bells (Ghungroo) and the movement harmonized to the music. The legs and torso are generally straight, and the story is told through a developed vocabulary based on the gestures of arms and upper body movement, facial expressions, neck movements, eyes and eyebrow movement , stage movements, bends and turns. The main focus of the dance becomes the eyes and the foot movements. The eyes work as a medium of communication of the story the dancer is trying to communicate. With the eyebrows the dancer gives various facial expressions. The difference between the sub-traditions is the relative emphasis between acting versus footwork, with Lucknow style emphasizing acting and Jaipur style famed for its spectacular footwork.

Kathak as a performance art has survived and thrived as an oral tradition, innovated and taught from one generation to another verbally and through practice. It transitioned, adapted, and integrated the tastes of the Mughal courts in the 16th and 17th centuries, particularly by Akbar, but stagnated and went into decline during the British colonial era, then was reborn as India and Pakistan gained independence and sought to rediscover its ancient roots and a sense of national identity through the arts.

Etymology and nomenclature
The term Kathak is rooted in the Vedic term Katha which means "story, conversation, traditional tale". Kathak refers to one of the major classical dance forms primarily found in northern India, with a historical influence similar to Bharatanatyam in south India, Odissi in east India and other major classical dances found in South Asia. It differs from the numerous folk dance forms found in the north and other parts of the Indian subcontinent.

The Kathak dancers, in the ancient India, were traveling bards and were known as Kathakas, or Kathakar.

Kathak has inspired simplified regional variants, such as the Bhavai – a form of rural theatre focussing on the tales of Hindu goddesses (Shakti), and one which emerged in the medieval era, is presently found in Gujarat, Rajasthan and Madhya Pradesh. Another variant that emerged from ancient Kathak is Thumri.

Thumri was developed by the tawaif community who were called "nautch" dancers by the British.  Their history as Kathak dancers have been erased in modern India Pallabi Chakravorty. (2008)."Bells Of Change: Kathak Dance, Women And Modernity In India", also see "The Tawaif And The Item Girl: A Struggle For Identity"

History 

According to Mary Snodgrass, the Kathak tradition of India is traceable to 400 BCE. The earliest surviving text with Kathak roots is the Natya Shastra, attributed to sage Bharata, and its first complete compilation is dated to between 200 BCE and 200 CE, but estimates vary between 500 BCE and 500 CE.

The most studied version of the Natya Shastra text consists of about 6000 verses structured into 36 chapters. The text, states Natalia Lidova, describes the theory of Tāṇḍava dance (Shiva), the theory of rasa, of bhāva, expression, gestures, acting techniques, basic steps, standing postures – all of which are part of Indian classical dances including Kathak. Dance and performance arts, states this ancient Hindu text, are a form of expression of spiritual ideas, virtues and the essence of scriptures.

The 2nd century BC panels found in Bharhut show the dancers in a vertical stance with their arms' positions already suggesting today's Kathak movements. Most of the dancers have one arm near the ear in a ''pataka hasta'' (Mudra). In subsequent years, the hasta was lowered to the bust level.

The term Kathakas in the sense of "storytellers" appears in ancient Hindu texts, such as the Mahabharata:

Bards, actors, dancers, songsters and musical reciters of legends and stories are mentioned hundreds of times in the Hindu Epics.

Bhakti movement era
Textual studies suggest that "Kathak" as a classical dance form likely started in Banares (Varanasi) and from there migrated northwest to Lucknow, Jaipur and other parts of north and northwest India. The Lucknow tradition of Kathak dance attributes the style to a Bhakti movement devotee named Ishwari from the Handia village in Allahabad, Uttar Pradesh, who credited Hindu God Krishna appearing in his dream and asking him to develop "dance as a form of worship". Ishwari taught his descendants, who in turn preserved the learning and developments through an oral tradition over six generations ultimately yielding the Lucknow version of the Kathak dance – a family tree that is acknowledged in both Hindu and Muslim music-related Indian literature.

The evolution in Kathak dance theme during the Bhakti movement centered primarily around divine Krishna, his lover Radha and milkmaids (gopis) – around legends and texts such as the Bhagavata Purana found in the Vaishnavism tradition of Hinduism. The love between Radha and Krishna became symbolism for the love between Atman (soul within) and the supreme source (Cosmic soul everywhere), a theme that dance ballet and mimetic plays of Kathak artists expressed. Although central Asian influence of Kathak rapid whirls has been proposed, Sangitaratnakara, a 13th-century Sanskrit text on Indian classical music and dance in Chapter 4 mentions a dance movement with rapid whirling around like a wheel keeping the arms in the Dola pose and bending the body inwards called 'Cakramandala' It is employed in worshipping gods and in vigorous movement.

The emergence of Raslila, mainly in the Braj region (Mathura in Western U.P.) was an important development. It combined in itself music, dance, and the narrative. Dance in Raslila, however, was mainly an extension of the basic mime and gestures of the Kathakars or story-tellers which blended easily with the existing traditional dance.

Mughal era
With the coming of the Mughals, this dance form received a new impetus. A transition from the temple courtyard to the palace durbar took place which necessitated changes in presentation. In both Hindu and Muslim courts, Kathak became highly stylized and came to be regarded as a sophisticated form of entertainment. Under the Muslims, there was a greater stress on nritya and bhavag - the dance's graceful, expressive and sensuous dimensions.

The Mughal era courts and nobles accepted Kathak as a form of aristocratic entertainment, which low income families were willing to provide.  According to Drid Williams:

Over time, the Kathak repertoire added Persian and Central Asian themes, such as the whirling of Sufi dance, the costumes replaced Saris with items that bared midriff and included a transparent veil of the type common with medieval Harem dancers. When the colonial European officials began arriving in India, the Kathak court entertainment they witnessed was a synthesis of the ancient Indian tradition and Central Asian-Persian dance form, and the Kathak dance performers were called the "nautch girls" (or natch, a derivative of the more difficult to pronounce Sanskrit natya).

British Raj era
With the expansion of British colonial rule in 19th-century India, Kathak along with all other classical dance forms were discouraged and it went into decline. This was in part the result of the Victorian morality of sexual repressiveness along with Anglican missionaries who criticized Hinduism. Reverend James Long, for example, proposed that Kathak dancers should forget ancient Indian tales and Hindu legends, and substitute them with European legends and Christian tales. Missionaries recorded their frustration in Church Missionary Review when they saw Hindu audiences applaud and shout "Ram, Ram" during Kathak performances.

The seductive gestures and facial expressions during Kathak performances in Temples and family occasions were caricatured in The Wrongs of Indian Womanhood, published at the start of the 20th century, as evidence of "harlots, debased erotic culture, slavery to idols and priests" tradition, and Christian missionaries demanded that this must be stopped, launching the "anti-dance movement" or "anti-nautch movement" in 1892. Officials and newspapers dehumanized the Kathak dancers and the sources of patronage were pressured to stop supporting the Kathak performing "nautch girls" (also termed as devadasis and tawa'ifs in mid 20th century literature). Many accused the dance form as a front for prostitution, while revivalists questioned the constructed histories by the colonial writers.

Not only did missionaries and colonial officials ridicule the Kathak dancers, Indian men who had been educated in British institution and had adapted to Victorian prudery joined the criticism, states Margaret Walker, possibly because they had lost their cultural connection, no longer understood the underlying spiritual themes behind the dance, and assumed this was one of the "social ills, immoral and backward elements" in their heritage that they must stamp out. However, the Hindu families continued their private tutoring and kept the Kathak art alive as an oral tradition. Kathak teachers also shifted to training boys to preserve the tradition, as most of the 20th-century ridicule had been directed at Kathak "nautch girls".

Kathak was brought to the attention of audiences outside India in the early 20th century through Kalkaprasad Maharaj.

Post-independence era
The movement to end the colonial era and for an independent India, states Walker, also witnessed a revival of Kathak and more broadly, a cultural ferment and effort to reclaim culture and rediscover history. The Kathak revival movements co-developed in Hindu gharanas, particularly by the Kathak-Misra community. Of these the Jaipur and Lucknow sub-traditions of Kathak have attracted more scholarship.

The oldest Kathak department pat a degree college (university) was formed in 1956 at Indira Kala Sangeet University, a public university located in Khairagarh where Dr. Puru Dadheech instated the first Kathak syllabus for degree programs.  It was inspired by the diploma syllabus of Mohanrao Kallianpurkar at Bhatkhande College.

According to a BBC Arts article, Kathak is unique in being practiced by the Muslim community of the India, and thus has a "historical link to Islam." Farah Yasmeen Shaikh, a Muslim and a disciple of Pandit Chitresh Das in the Lucknow school, considers Kathak as a "confluence of Hindu and Muslim cultures", and has presented her performance in Pakistan. In contrast, states BBC, Nahid Siddiqui (a legendary Kathak dancer from Pakistan, settled and nurtured in the UK), has a hard time practising and presenting her [Kathak] art in her birth-country of Pakistan".

While most scholars consider Kathak as an ancient art, some such as Margaret Walker suggest the modern Kathak is a 20th-century phenomenon, more a form of cultural revival, if one relies on the music-related Indian documents.

Repertoire

A modern Kathak, in all three major sub-traditions called Lucknow, Benares and Jaipur styles (gharana), states Bruno Nettl, consist of three main sections - the invocation, one pure (abstract) dance recital and one expressive dance.

The invocation (vandana) consists of the dancer coming to stage and offering respect to his or her guru and the musicians on the stage. If the team is from the Hindu tradition, the dancer(s) combine facial expressions and hand gestures (mudra) to invoke Hindu gods and goddesses; while a Muslim performance replace the devotional expressions with a salami (salutation).

The pure dance is called a nritta, while the expressive dance is called a nritya. A Kathak performance can be solo, duo or team. In a technical performance, the speed and energy the dancers exchange with the audience increases in multiples, that is the tempo doubles or quadruples. During the performance, one or more of the Kathak artists may come to the microphone, interact with the audience, explain something, tell an anecdote in a particular language, or rhythmically recite a song.

The costumes of the dancer and the facial cosmetics between a Hindu or Muslim Kathak dance troupe varies. The stage typically is bare with no distracting background, states Williams, with musicians seated on rugs downstage right (audience's left), and if it is a Hindu performance there is an image of dancing Shiva (Nataraja) or a Ganesha on the stage's left with flowers and perfumed incense burning.

Pure dance (Nritta)
The nritta  performance starts off with a thàth sequence, which is a slower graceful movement of wrists, neck and eyebrows. Thereafter, the dancer gradually increases speed and energy, while completing a sequence of bol (mnemonic syllables in Indian tradition). Each bol has short sections, similar to technical exercises in western dance traditions, wherein the dancer engages the audience with tora, tukra, parhant, paran and others stressing footwork, gestures and turns. Each section when completed has a punctuation mark, usually a sharp turn of the head. Each ankle is adorned with small bells (ghungroo), which may have just one bell or hundreds. The dancer's rapid movements and footwork in a nritta is perfectly timed to the musical beats (tala) and tempos, and the footwork sequences are called tatkars.

Most of the Nritta performance is abstract, fast and rhythmic aspect of Kathak. In a Kathak nritta, as with all classical Indian  dance forms, the viewer is presented with pure movement, wherein the emphasis is the beauty in motion, form, speed, range and pattern. It aims to engage the senses (prakriti) of the audience.

Expressive dance (Nritya)

Nritya is slower and expressive aspect of Kathak that attempts to communicate feelings, storyline particularly with spiritual themes in Hindu dance traditions. In a nritya, the dance expands to include words, musical notes and gestures to articulate a legend or message, it is more than sensory enjoyment, it aims to engage the emotions and mind of the viewer.

The expressiveness of Kathak is also found in other classical dances of India. Its roots are found in the Natyashastra text which defines drama in verse 6.10 as that which aesthetically arouses joy in the spectator, through the medium of actor's art of communication, that helps connect and transport the individual into a super sensual inner state of being. The Natya connects through abhinaya (literally, "carrying to the spectators"), that is applying body-speech-mind and scene, wherein asserts Natyashastra, the actors communicate to the audience, through song and music. Drama in this ancient Sanskrit text, thus is an art to engage every aspect of life, in order to glorify and gift a state of joyful consciousness. According to Massey, another important ancient text that has influenced Kathak is the Abhinaya Darpanam of Nandikeshvara (~2nd century CE). 

In Kathak, abhinaya is in the form of expressive gestures and pantomime set to music that usually outline a legend or the plot of a well known story. The gestures and facial expressions convey the ras (sentiment, emotional taste) and bhava (mood) of the underlying story. In the Hindu texts on dance, the guru and the artists successfully express the spiritual ideas by paying attention to four aspects of a performance: Angik (gestures and body language), Vachik (song, recitation, music and rhythm), Aharya (costume, make up, jewelry), and Satvik (artist's mental disposition and emotional connection with the story and audience, wherein the artist's inner and outer state resonates). A Kathak nritya performance, however grants flexibility to the artists and invites improvisation, and it may not be accompanied with a song or recital about the legend. The stories in Kathak performance generally tend to be about the Hindu god Krishna (or in some cases Shiva or Devi), and the stories come from sources such as the Bhagavata Purana, or the Indian Epics. This form of expressiveness is also found in thumri and Persian ghazals.

Costumes
The costumes vary among Kathak performers, and find their sources in either Hindu or Muslim culture.

The Hindu costume for female dancers has two variations.One is based on a Sari, but is worn in a style different from the customary style that goes over the left shoulder. A Kathak artist generally wraps the sari around the waist and it hangs down from the left. A blouse called choli covers the upper body. The artist may wear a scarf (called orhni in some places). Hair, face, ear, neck, hand, wrist and ankle jewellery, typically of gold, may adorn the artist. A tika or bindi in the middle of forehead is common.  The second variation of a Hindu Kathak dancer uses a long, full (just above the ankle), light-weight skirt usually with embroidered border that helps highlight the dance motion. The skirt is contrasted with a different color choli, and a transparent scarf typically drapes over it and the dancer's head. Jewelry is typically present in the second variation.

The Muslim costume for female dancers also uses a skirt, but includes close fitting churidar pyjamas and sometimes a long coat covering hands and the upper body. The head has a cover scarf and the jewelry is light.

The Hindu costume for male Kathak performers is typically a silk dhoti draped around the waist, and covered with a silk scarf tied over the top. The upper body is usually left bare or with only the Hindu thread, but is sometimes covered with a loose sleeveless jacket. Kathak male artists also wear jewelry, but often of stones and much simpler than the female artists.
The Mughal costume for male Kathak performers is kurta-churidar. The kurta can be a simple one, or cut as an angarkha.  There is also the possibility of adapting the angarkha or kurta for dance to incorporate wider flare in the lower portion. Particularly older variety costumes include the small peaked cap too.

Instruments
The ensemble of musical instruments vary with any Kathak performer, ranging from two to twelve  classical Indian instruments or more in versions with synthetic innovations. The most common instruments that go with Kathak are tabla (a pair of hand drums) that syncs with the dancer's feet rhythms, sarangi or harmonium with manjira (hand cymbals) that meters the tal (cycle), and other instruments to add effect, depth and structure to the expressive stage of a Kathak performance.

Music
The ancient music genre of India, Dhrupad, was re-introduced into Kathak for the first time by India's senior Kathak exponent Mahamahopadhyay Dr. Pandit Puru Dadheech.  He is India's first Kathak dancer to bring back 'Dhrupad' on the formal Kathak stage and this composition in 28 matra. Shankar Pralayankar, his Dhrupad composition, has the unique status of regularly being sung in concerts by 'Dhrupad' maestros the Gundecha Brothers.

Gharanas
Kathak is a diffuse tradition, of which three gharanas (schools) are more well known and studied – Jaipur, Benares and Lucknow. The schools place different relative emphasis between aspects of a Kathak performance such as the acting versus footwork. The Lucknow style, for example, emphasizes acting while Jaipur style emphasizes the dance and footwork. Traditionally, the Jaipur gharana has had a strong spiritual flavor, covering a diverse range of ideas in Vaishnavism and Shaivism.

The Jaipur gharana traces its origins to Bhanuji, a famed Shiva Tandava dancer who upon visiting Vrindavan was inspired and taught Natvari Nritya. Bhanuji's grandons Laluji and Kanhuji were similarly inspired by Krishna. They returned to Jaipur, and together they began the Jaipur gharana of Kathak. The Jaipur style developed under the sponsorship of Rajput rulers, and they favored the Kathak dance with Hindu religious themes. In the modern era, this school has continued their emphasis on dance and footwork with Jai Lal, Janki Prasad, Kundan Lal, Mohan Lal and Nawal Kishore. This school is best known for its systematic innovations in rhythmic dancing, and the use of dance movement to express a story. 

The Lucknow gharana of Kathak dance attributes its origins to a rural Krishna devotee named Ishwari from the village in southeast Uttar Pradesh, who aimed to develop Kathak dance as a form of loving devotion to Krishna. This school thrived after the Mughal Empire collapsed, when Kathak artists moved from Delhi to Lucknow under the sponsorship of Avadh nawabs who favored court dance culture. In the modern era, the Lucknow gharana style influences the dance school in New Delhi with Shambu Maharaj, Birju Maharaj and Lacchu Maharaj. Kathak choreography there has developed themes beyond Krishna-Radha, such as those based on the drama works of Kalidasa's Shiva-Parvati and Bhavabhuti's Malati-Madhav. This school has also attempted a Hindu-Muslim Kathak fusion style, highlighting the court dancers theme.

The Benares gharana is the third major style, traditionally believed to be the oldest. Its history is unclear. According to Kothari, the school started with Janakiprasad from a village near Bikaner who resettled in Varanasi, but one whose ancestors were famed dancers and musicians. Janakiprasad was a dancer and a Sanskrit scholar, and credited with inventing the bols of Kathak, which are mnemonic syllables within the language of this classical dance of India.

According to Nicole Lehmann, modern Kathak dancers show, to varying degrees, a fusion of the styles from all three gharanas.

Relationship with other art forms
The north Indian Kathak dance differs from the south Indian Bharatanatyam in several ways, even though both have roots in the Hindu text Natya Shastra. Kathak expressions – particularly in Hindu devotional styles – are more introverted and withdrawn, while Bharatanatyam is more extroverted and expansive. Kathak is normally performed in a standing form with legs and torso typically straight, while Bharatanatyam extensively utilizes bent knee form (ara mandi, half sitting position that is somewhat similar to Demi Plié ballet move).

Kathak is also different from Kathakali, though both are Indian classical dance traditions of "story play" wherein the stories have been traditionally derived from the Hindu epics and the Puranas. Kathakali emerged in the southwestern region of India (modern Kerala), and is distinctive in its elaborate codified colorful makeup, masks and costumes. Kathakali traditionally has been troupes of predominantly male actor-dancers, who dress up as hero, heroines, gods, goddesses, demons, demonesses, priests, animals and daily life characters. Both dance forms employ elaborate footwork, choreography and hand gestures, but Kathakali integrates south Indian martial arts movements such as leaps and jumps. Both dance forms trace their roots to classical Sanskrit texts, but Kathakali has relatively more recent origins, more closely follows the Hastha Lakshanadeepika text and began flourishing in the 16th century. While each has a different musical and dance language, both deploy a host of similar traditional Indian musical instruments.

According to Miriam Phillips, the Indian Kathak and the Spanish Flamenco dance share many visual, rhythmic and kinesthetic similarities.

Gallery

See also
 List of Kathak exponents

Notes

References

Bibliography

 
 
 

, Table of Contents

 Kothari, Sunil (1989) Kathak: Indian Classical Dance Art, Abhinav Publications, New Delhi. 
 Kippen, James and Bel, Andreine Lucknow Kathak Dance, Bansuri, Volume 13, 1996
 Pt. Birju Maharaj (2002) Ang Kavya : Nomenclature for Hand Movements and Feet Positions in Kathak, New Delhi, Har-Anand, photographs, .
 Bharti Gupta (2004) Kathak Sagar, New Delhi, Radha Pub., 
 Sushil Kumar Saxena (2006) Swinging Syllables Aesthetics of Kathak Dance, New Delhi, Hope India Publications, 
 Shivvangini Classes Shiva Mathur(Lucknow Kathak Dance)
 Dr. Puru Dadheech Kathak Nritya Shiksha, Bindu Publications, Indore, MP, India
 Narayan, Shovana (2004) Kathak, Wisdom Tree,

External links

Courtesans and Choreographers: The (Re) Placement of Women in the History of Kathak Dance, Margaret Walker (2010)
Becoming the Floor/Breaking the Floor: Experiencing the Kathak-Flamenco Connection, Mariam Phillips (2013)
Ganesh Vandana, Meghranjani Medhi, Section 1: Invocation of a three part Kathak dance
A Kathak performance, Shinjini Kulkarni, Aarohan (2015)

 
Culture of Awadh
Culture of Uttar Pradesh
Classical dance genres of India